South Philadelphia High School is a public secondary high school located in the Lower Moyamensing neighborhood of South Philadelphia, at the intersection of Broad Street and Snyder Avenue.

The school serves grades 9 through 12 and is part of the School District of Philadelphia.

The school serves portions of South Philadelphia (including Southwark), and it previously served the Rittenhouse Square and Logan Square sections of Center City.

History
Originally built in 1907 as the Southern Manual Training High School for boys. The Philadelphia School District administrators opened the School merely as a three-year training facility for immigrant children, mostly Jewish and Italian, and children who lacked intellectual skills who "could only work with their hands". But Israel Goldstein, a student and the first alumni scholarship winner in 1911, showed school administrators that there was more promise for academics. He graduated the school at age 14 and then graduated the University of Pennsylvania at the age of 17. Goldstein became a rabbi, an author, a spiritual leader, and founder of Brandeis University in Waltham. Massachusetts. He became a leader of the Zionist movement in America and founder of the National Conference of Christians and Jews. Due in part to young Israel Goldstein as an example of student possibilities, the 3-year training facility became a full four-year co-ed high school.

In the late 1960s, the student population of the high school changed from predominantly poor Jewish and Italian immigrant and first-generation children to increasing low-middle income African-American and immigrant Asian-American children. The number of student enrollment from 1960 to 2009 declined from over 1,000 to less than 500 students. There had always been a significant Black presence at South Philadelphia High School. In the 1960s, each fall and spring, fights broke out between larger groups of Italian-Americans and smaller groups of African-American students, which either led to or were initiated by neighborhood violence which included students from Bishop Neumann Catholic High School. Stabbings, shootings, and even homicides were connected to this violence. The school is effectively surrounded by an Italian-American community.

In the 2000s the school had an Asian American population that made up around 20% of the school and an African-American population of 65–70%, The Asian American population consisted of new immigrants along with an earlier Vietnamese-American and Cambodian-American refugee population that had arrived in the 1980s and 1990s. Tammy Kim of Hyphen said "the school, despite its otherwise nefarious reputation, has become well known for its [English as a second language] program.". White students now make up 6% of the student body.  While vibrant Italian-American and Irish-American communities remain vital components of the new multicultural South Philadelphia, these groups now compose 19.6% and 10.4% in zip codes of 19145 through 19148.

In December 2009, several Asian American students accused the school district of mishandling racial attacks that targeted Asian-American students. On December 4, 2009, 26 Asian-American immigrant students, most of whom were of Chinese and Vietnamese descent, were attacked by a group of mostly African American students near campus. Officials involved in resolving the incident, including Superintendent Arlene Ackerman and retired U.S. District Court Judge James T. Giles, were accused of failing to address the rising racial tension between different ethnic groups within the school, mishandling key evidence and eyewitness accounts in recent related attacks, and falsely accusing and punishing Asian-American students for inciting the attacks. Their actions prompted national outrage and boycotts from local Asian-American communities.

Bok Technical High School was scheduled to merge with South Philadelphia High in 2013.

Professional boxing shows
The school was the site of three professional boxing shows in 2009, including one starring Gabriel Rosado in which Carol Polis, considered to be the first woman judge in the sport's history, judged.

Transportation
SEPTA serves the school with Routes 2, 4, 37, 79, and the Broad Street Line.

Feeder patterns
Feeder K-8 schools include:
 F. Amadee Bregy School
 George W. Childs School
 D. Newlin Fell School
 Delaplaine McDaniel School
 Southwark School
 Edwin M. Stanton School

Feeder elementary schools include Abram Jenks (which first feeds into Fell), and Francis Scott Key (which first feeds into Southwark school).

In previous eras Albert M. Greenfield School (K-8) in Rittenhouse Square fed into South Philly High. Previously feeder middle schools included Norris S. Barratt Middle School.

Demographics
As of 2010, about 1,000 students attend the school. 70% were black, 18% were Asian, and about 11% were non-Hispanic White or Hispanic.
As of 2010 the second floor housed immigrant students. An update: during the school year 2014–2015, the school district successfully integrated the immigrant students with the general student body while maintaining the Bilingual Newcomer (including an Asian American Studies) supports. The immigrant students are no longer separated/segregated on the second floor.

Academics
By September 1998 the school established a bilingual English-Chinese program to serve Chinese immigrant students, and that month it began hiring teachers fluent in both languages to teach core subjects.

Architecture

The original school building was constructed 1907 in a Norman Romanesque style designed by Board of Education Architect Lloyd Titus. The main building had an exterior grey stone façade, with two additions added.

Student capacity was three hundred fifty boy students. It expanded in 1914 for more boy students and a duplicate structure built for a new Girls' School with a passage connecting the two buildings that was referred to as "The Tunnel". In 1941 an open field located seven blocks south at 10th and Bigler streets was purchased by a student fund raising and added to the school property as an athletic field to enhance the athletic program. The field was completely renovated in 2008 by the School District of Philadelphia as a supercomplex for larger District-wide events. The original School of 1907 was demolished in 1955.

A new rectangular shaped building was constructed and opened in 1956 on half of the site. The single building was built as a co-ed facility. The frontage included a new grand sized patio plaza entrance, large asphalted school yard and significant green space enclosed with a regal looking four foot black iron railing tipped in gold painted points. The modern architecture style utilized interior walls of cinder block, cement flooring and staircases, with a facade of light colored tan brick and large galvanized steel metal framed classroom windows.  It contained four stories of 190 classrooms with an all modern infra-structure, a large gymnasium, auditorium and lunchroom with 1,500 seats.

In 2013 South Philadelphia High School in partnership with the Lower Moyamensing Civic Association gathered resources for a new sustainable master plan on urban crowdsourcing platform Projexity. The master plan anticipates the creation of rooftop agriculture, outdoor classrooms, porous pavement, solar panels, and many more improvements.

In 2018, in partnership with the Mural Arts Program, Artist Ben Volta worked with students and the local community to create the mural that covers the front walls of the school. Called Parts Per Million, it refers to the way that carbon dioxide is measured in the atmosphere, using it as a metaphor for change through collective action.

Student organizations
After an incident occurred in October 2008 when 30 black students chased and attacked 5 Asian students, a Chinese student named Wei Chen, who originated from Fujian Province, founded the Chinese-American Student Association in order to help orient new immigrants into the school and to keep records of assaults against Chinese students. Chen later organized protests after a 2009 attack on Asian students.

Notable alumni

Al Alberts (1946),  (1946) singer and composer
Marian Anderson (1919), (1919) opera and spiritual singer
Nate Blackwell (1983), former professional basketball player, San Antonio Spurs
Al Brancato (1939), former professional baseball player, Philadelphia Athletics
Stan Brown (1947), former professional basketball player, Philadelphia Sphas and Philadelphia Warriors
Chubby Checker (1958), singer and songwriter, popularized the Twist dance craze of late 1950s and early 1960s
Angelo DiGeorge (1939), Renowned pediatric endocrinologist
Fred Diodati (1950), Lead singer of The Four Aces
Eddie Feinberg, former professional baseball player, Philadelphia Phillies
Lois Fernandez African-rights activist and founder of the Odunde Festival.
Louis Fischer (1914),  Journalist.
Frank Forbes (1910), Baseball player, founder of the Negro National League.
Frank Gasparro (1927), Chief Engraver of the United States Mint.
Harry Gold (1929), Atomic spy
Israel Goldstein (1911), Rabbi, author and Zionist leader, founder of Brandeis University.
Edward Gottlieb (1916), NBA team coach, manager and owner. 
Charlie Gracie (1954), Rock pioneer and singer
Frank Guarrera (1942), Opera singer
Rodney Harvey (did not graduate), actor (The Outsiders, My Own Private Idaho). 
Edward Heffron attended So Philly High, WW 2 Easy Co 506th, 101st Airborne, Band of Brothers HBO mini series
Harry E. Kalodner (1912), United States federal judge
Red Klotz (1940), NBA basketball player and coach.
Irv Kosloff (1930), NBA team owner.
Samuel Noah Kramer (1915), Assyriologist and Sumerian historian.
Mario Lanza (1940) Opera singer, actor
Joseph Anthony "Uncle Joe" Ligambi, retired boss of the Philadelphia crime family
John Liney, American cartoonist 
Harry Litwack (1925), College men's basketball coach
Hal Marnie (1937), Major League Baseball player
Bob McCann (1947), NBA player
John Mercanti (1962), Chief Engraver of the United States Mint
Robert K. Merton sociologist
Vincent Persichetti (1933), Composer, pianist and teacher at the Juilliard School
Carmen Piccone (1947), Head football coach for the Southern Illinois Salukis
Peter Mark Richman (1945), Film and on television actor
Petey Rosenberg (1937), Basketball Association of America player
John Sandusky (1945), National Football League player (Cleveland Browns, Green Bay Packers) and coach (Baltimore Colts, Philadelphia Eagles, Miami Dolphins)
Lionel Simmons (1986), NBA player
Joe Scarpa (1965), Notorious Cheapskate (World Wide Wrestling Federation as "Chief Jay Strongbow").
Joseph Stefano (1940), Screenwriter (Psycho, Outer Limits)
H. Patrick Swygert, 1960, University president (University at Albany, SUNY, Howard University), executive vice president (Temple University) and professor (Temple University Beasley School of Law)
Martin Weinberg 1955, Senior research sociologist at The Kinsey Institute and university professor (Northwestern University, Rutgers University).
Stanley Weintraub, 1946, Professor, historian, and biographer

See also

South Philadelphia

References

External links

South Philadelphia High School
South Philadelphia High School alumni association

High schools in Philadelphia
School District of Philadelphia
School buildings completed in 1907
Public high schools in Pennsylvania
1907 establishments in Pennsylvania
South Philadelphia